Future Games is the fifth studio album by British-American rock band Fleetwood Mac, released on 3 September 1971. It was recorded in the summer of 1971 at Advision Studios in London and was the first album to feature Christine McVie as a full member. This album was also the first of five albums to feature American guitarist Bob Welch. "He was totally different background – R&B, sort of jazzy. He brought his personality," Mick Fleetwood said of Welch in a 1995 BBC interview. "He was a member of Fleetwood Mac before we'd even played a note."

The album peaked at number 91 on the US Billboard 200 chart dated 18 December 1971. The album was certified gold by the Recording Industry Association of America (RIAA) in 2000.

Background
After founder and original bandleader Peter Green departed Fleetwood Mac in May 1970, the remaining members recorded the album Kiln House, with bassist John McVie's wife Christine Perfect being a major collaborator during the sessions. She was soon promoted to full-time membership as the band's keyboardist, and began writing and singing her own material with them. While the band was touring the Kiln House album, guitarist and vocalist Jeremy Spencer abruptly quit the band in February 1971 to join the Children of God, a Christian New Religious Movement founded by David Berg. Fleetwood Mac held auditions for a replacement during the summer and eventually selected Bob Welch after hearing his demo tape.

Without Spencer's Chicago blues and 1950s rock and roll leanings, the band moved further away from blues and closer to the melodic pop sound that would finally break them into America four years later. After the band completed the album and turned it in, the record label said that it would not release an album with only seven songs, and demanded that they record an eighth. "What a Shame" was recorded hastily as a jam to fulfill this request.

Welch's primary guitar at the time was a Gibson ES-345, which he played on the record along with a Fender Stratocaster.

Track notes
There is an early version of "Morning Rain" with the title "Start Again", as recorded in a BBC session on 5 January 1971.

"What a Shame" featured saxophone from Christine McVie's brother John Perfect whose son Dan later co-produced and featured as guitarist/co-writer on McVie's 2004 album In the Meantime.

The title track, written by then-newcomer Bob Welch, was later re-recorded for his 1979 solo album The Other One and again for His Fleetwood Mac Years & Beyond in 2003. The original version is featured in the 2000 movie Almost Famous.

A heavily edited version of "Sands of Time" (b/w "Lay It All Down") was an unsuccessful single in the United States and some other territories. An alternate version of "Lay It All Down" appeared on the 1992 compilation 25 Years – The Chain. The single edit of "Sands of Time" was released on the deluxe edition of the 50 Years – Don't Stop compilation in 2018 and later as a bonus track on the 2020 remastered reissue of Future Games. Also included on the remastered Future Games release were alternate versions of "Sometimes" and "Show Me a Smile", a much longer alternate version of "Lay It All Down", the full jam of "What a Shame" which included vocals, plus an acoustic demo of another Welch song, "Stone".

Artwork
Early UK and American releases of this album, along with some other country's issues, have a yellow background to the picture of the two children and cover text. All subsequent releases have a green background. The 2013 vinyl reissue by Warner/Rhino available in the Fleetwood Mac: 1969 to 1972 4-LP box set restores the original yellow background to the album artwork, and it was released as a standalone LP two years later.

Release and reception

Charts and commercial performance
Future Games debuted at number 186 on the US Billboard 200 chart dated 30 October 1971. The album reached its peak at number 91 on the chart dated 18 December 1971, after being on the chart for eight weeks. The album ultimately spent a total of 12 weeks on the chart. On 4 October 2000, the album was certified gold by the Recording Industry Association of America (RIAA) for sales of over 500,000 copies in the United States.

Track listing

Note: The song timings listed here are not as indicated on all LPs/CDs, since some of the timings on some releases are inaccurate. On some versions of the album (depending on the country of issue), the notes state that the track "Woman of 1000 Years" runs for 8:20, when in fact it runs for 5:28. Similarly, "Morning Rain" is listed as 6:22 and runs for 5:38, while the track "Sometimes" is listed to run for 6:25 and only runs for 5:26.

Personnel
Fleetwood Mac
Danny Kirwan – guitar, vocals
Bob Welch – guitar, vocals
Christine McVie – keyboards, vocals
John McVie – bass guitar
Mick Fleetwood – drums, percussion

Additional personnel
John Perfect – saxophone on "What a Shame"

Production
Producer: Fleetwood Mac
Engineer: Martin Rushent
Studio: Advision
Sleeve design: John Pasche
Cover photo by Sally Jesse
Group photos by Edmund Shea

Charts

Certifications

Sources
 Bob Brunning, Fleetwood Mac: The First 30 Years, Omnibus Press, London, 1998,

References

Fleetwood Mac albums
1971 albums
Reprise Records albums
Albums produced by Danny Kirwan
Albums produced by Bob Welch (musician)
Albums produced by Christine McVie
Albums produced by John McVie
Albums produced by Mick Fleetwood